Gagarinsky (masculine), Gagarinskaya (feminine), or Gagarinskoye (neuter) may refer to:
Gagarinsky District, name of several districts in Russia
Gagarinskoye Municipal Okrug, a municipal okrug of Moskovsky District of Saint Petersburg, Russia
Gagarinskoye Urban Settlement, an administrative division and a municipal formation which the town of Gagarin and one rural locality in Gagarinsky District of Smolensk Oblast, Russia are incorporated as
Gagarinsky (inhabited locality) (Gagarinskaya, Gagarinskoye), several rural localities in Russia
Gagarinskaya metro station, several metro stations in Russia

See also
Gagarin (disambiguation)